The Warroad Lakers were an American Senior ice hockey team from Warroad, Minnesota.  The Lakers played in various Manitoba AHA and Thunder Bay AHA senior and intermediate leagues and were granted special eligibility for the Allan Cup and Hardy Cup by the Canadian Amateur Hockey Association.  The Lakers were three-time Allan Cup Canadian National Champions, one-time Allan Cup National Finalists, one-time Hardy Cup Canadian National Champions, and one-time Hardy Cup National Finalists.

History
The Lakers were Western Canada Intermediate "A" Champions in 1964, 1974, and 1977, Thunder Bay Intermediate "A" Champions in 1963 and 1964, and Manitoba Intermediate "A" Champions in at least 1971, 1974, and 1977.  They were also Thunder Bay Senior "A" Champions in 1965 and Manitoba Senior "A" Champions in at least 1969, 1992, 1993, 1994, 1995, 1996, and 1997.

At the 1974 Hardy Cup, the Lakers faced the Ottawa District Hockey Association's Embrun Panthers.  The Lakers swept them 3-games-to-none to win their only Hardy Cup.  Three years later, the Lakers faced New Brunswick's Campbellton Tigers at the 1977 Hardy Cup, but fell 3-games-to-1.

The Warroad Lakers are only the second American team in Allan Cup history to be Canadian National Senior "AAA" Champions.  They won the 1994 Allan Cup on home ice, the next year they won the 1995 Allan Cup in Stony Plain, Alberta, and then won the 1996 Allan Cup in Unity, Saskatchewan to become the only team in history to win three consecutive Allan Cups.  A season later, the Lakers failed to defeat the Powell River Regals in the 1997 Allan Cup final, which would have given them four in a row if won.

In 1997, after finding themselves without a league to play in, the Warroad Lakers were forced to fold.

Around 2001, the team was resurrected and named the Warroad Islanders.  They competed in the 2002 Allan Cup but failed to get out of the round robin.  In 2003, the Islanders failed to get past the Ile des Chenes North Stars (who won the 2003 Allan Cup) in the Manitoba playdowns.  Soon after, the team fell off the competitive hockey map.

All three of the Lakers' Allan Cup winning teams have been inducted into the Manitoba Hockey Hall of Fame.

Season-by-season results

Notable alumni

Henry Boucha
Bill Christian
Dave Christian
Roger Christian
Blane Comstock
Chad Erickson
Alan Hangsleben
Jim Henry
Ken Johannson
Bob Johnson
Julian Klymkiw
Ed Kryzanowski
Larry Olimb
Dave Richardson
Clarence Schmidt
Wyatt Smith
Art Stratton

See also
List of ice hockey teams in Manitoba

References

External links
Official Allan Cup page
A-Z Hockey Warroad Lakers entry

Defunct ice hockey teams in Manitoba
Defunct ice hockey teams in Minnesota
Roseau County, Minnesota
Senior ice hockey teams